Harrison Reed is the name of:

Harrison Reed (politician) (1813–1899), ninth Governor of Florida
Harrison Reed (ice hockey) (born 1988), Canadian ice hockey player
Harrison Reed (footballer) (born 1995), English association football player